Kori Marie Inkpen (also published as Kori Inkpen Quinn) is a Canadian computer scientist specializing in human-computer interaction at Microsoft Research. A consistent theme of her research has been the interaction of children with computers.

Inkpen is a 1992 graduate of Dalhousie University,
and completed her Ph.D. in 1997 at the University of British Columbia (UBC).
At UBC, she credits Maria Klawe and a project led by Klawe on educational electronic games for sparking her interest in human-computer interaction and encouraging her to continue in academic computer science. Her dissertation, Adapting the Human-Computer Interface to Support Collaborative Learning Environments, was jointly supervised by Klawe and Kellogg S. Booth.

After postdoctoral research at the University of Washington, she was a faculty member at Simon Fraser University from 1998 to 2001 and at Dalhousie University from 2001 to 2007 before joining Microsoft in 2008.

In 2017 the Canadian Human-Computer Communications Society gave her their CHCCS/SCDHM Achievement Award "for her many contributions to the field of human-computer interaction, especially her work on collaboration technologies".

References

External links

A Conversation with the CHCCS 2017 Achievement Award Winner: Kori Inkpen, Microsoft Research

Year of birth missing (living people)
Living people
Canadian women computer scientists
Canadian computer scientists
Human–computer interaction researchers
Dalhousie University alumni
University of British Columbia alumni
Academic staff of Simon Fraser University
Academic staff of the Dalhousie University
Microsoft Research people